In Greek mythology, Chrysaor (Chrysáor, gen.: Χρυσάορος, Chrysáoros; English translation: "he who has a golden sword" [from χρυσός, "golden" and ἄορ, "sword"]), was the brother of the winged horse Pegasus, often depicted as a young man, the son of Poseidon and Medusa, born when Perseus decapitated the gorgon.

Mythology
In Greek mythology, Medusa was one of the Gorgons, three monstrous siblings. Medusa, unlike her sisters Stheno and Euryale, was mortal, and was beheaded by Perseus. Chrysaor and Pegasus sprang from the blood of her decapitated body.

In art, Chrysaor's earliest appearance seems to be on the great pediment of the early 6th century BC Doric Temple of Artemis at Corfu, where he is shown beside his mother, Medusa.

Offspring
Chrysaor, married to Callirrhoe, daughter of glorious Oceanus, was father to the triple-headed Geryon, but Geryon was killed by the great strength of Heracles at sea-circled Erytheis beside his own shambling cattle on that day when Heracles drove those broad-faced cattle toward holy Tiryns, when he crossed the stream of Oceanus and had killed Orthos and the oxherd Eurytion out in the gloomy meadow beyond fabulous Oceanus. 
—Hesiod, Theogony 287
Chrysaor and Callirrhoe may have also been the parents of Echidna.

In an alternate genealogy from Stephanus of Byzantium’s Ethnica, Chrysaor is a son of Glaucus and grandson of Sisyphus, and his son Mylasus goes on to found Mylasa. This ancestry would make Chrysaor a double of Bellerophon.

In popular culture
In Rick Riordan's Percy Jackson universe, Chrysaor is briefly an antagonist in The Heroes of Olympus: The Mark of Athena.

Notes

References
 Smith, William, Dictionary of Greek and Roman Biography and Mythology, London (1873). "Chrysaor"
 Ovid, Metamorphoses

External links
 The Theoi Project, "KHRYSAOR" 
 Magna Graecia: An Introduction

Hellenistic Caria
Kings in Greek mythology
Children of Poseidon
Medusa